Alice Sotero (born 28 May 1991) is an Italian modern pentathlete. She represented Italy at the 2016 Summer Olympics, and the 2020 Summer Olympics.

References

External links 
 
 

1991 births
Living people
Italian female modern pentathletes
Modern pentathletes at the 2016 Summer Olympics
Modern pentathletes at the 2020 Summer Olympics
Olympic modern pentathletes of Italy
20th-century Italian women
21st-century Italian women